A physician assistant or physician associate (PA) is a type of mid-level health care provider. In North America PAs may diagnose illnesses, develop and manage treatment plans, prescribe medications, and serve as a principal healthcare provider. PAs are required in many states to have a direct agreement with a physician.

In the United States and Canada, PAs are certified by their respective certifying bodies. The educational model was initially based upon the accelerated training of physicians during the shortage of qualified medical providers during World War II. In the UK, PAs were introduced in 2003. They support GPs, but require oversight from a physician.

Nomenclature

The occupational title of physician assistant and physician associate originated in the United States in 1967 at Duke University. The role has been adopted in the US, Canada, UK and Ireland, each with their own nomenclature. The role has been adopted in the US, Canada, United Kingdom, Republic of Ireland, Netherlands, Australia, New Zealand, India, Israel, Poland, Bulgaria, Myanmar, Switzerland, Liberia, Ghana, and by analogous names throughout Africa, each with their own nomenclature and education structure.

Services
Physician assistants or associates may:
conduct patient interviews and take medical histories
conduct physical examinations
order and interpret diagnostic tests and exams
diagnose illnesses
formulate treatment plans
coordinate and manage care
perform medical procedures
prescribe medications
conduct clinical research
provide patient counselling
offer advice on preventative health care
first assist in surgery

Workplaces 
Physician assistants or associates train to work in settings such as hospitals, clinics and other types of health facilities, or virtually via telemedicine. PAs are commonly found working in teaching and research as well as hospital administration and other clinical environments. PAs may practice in primary care or medical specialties, including emergency medicine, surgery and cardiology.

Training 
Physician assistant or associate education is shorter than a medical degree. It also typically does not involve residency training, although this is increasingly offered in a variety of specialties. Renewal of certification is usually required every few years, varying by jurisdiction.

History 
In 1961 Charles Hudson recommended that the American Medical Association create new medical provider certifications. Eugene A. Stead of the Duke University Medical Center assembled the first class of physician assistants in 1965, composed of four former US Navy Hospital Corpsmen. He based the curriculum of the PA program on his first-hand knowledge of the fast-track training of medical doctors during World War II. Two other physicians, Richard Smith at the University of Washington, and Hu Myers at Alderson-Broaddus College launched their own programs in the mid-late 1960s. Dr. J. Willis Hurst started the Emory University Physician Assistant Program in 1967.

The Liberian model of PAs was a curriculum intended for graduates to work in areas absent of physicians as physician substitutes.  Advisors for this program included UNICEF, American physicians and Agnes N. Dagbe, MS, RN, a Liberian nurse educated in the US.  Additional training was in the USSR.  The Liberian government inaugurated the program in 1965 with Dagbe as PA program.

Beginning in January 1971, the US Army produced eight classes of physician assistants, at 30 students per class, through the Academy of Health Sciences, Brooke Medical Center (academically accredited by Baylor University).

In 2017, approximately 68% of physician assistants in the United States identified as women and approximately 32% identified as men.

The profession expanded globally. It can now be found in Afghanistan, Australia, Canada, Germany, Ghana, India, Israel, Liberia, the Netherlands, New Zealand, Saudi Arabia, and the United Kingdom. As a profession physician assistants have greatly influenced the theory and conceptualization of socially accountable health professional education.

Jurisdictions

Australia 
In 2011, Health Workforce Australia began developing the role of physician assistant throughout the country culminating with registration and a PA Program based out of James Cook University. Despite all initial indicators showing that the new profession would be successfully integrated into the health care system, the progress has floundered resulting in the majority of PAs in Australia being unemployed.

Canada

Overview
, there are approximately 800 physician assistants working in healthcare settings in Canada. The first formally trained physician assistants graduated in 1984 from the Canadian Forces Medical Services School at Borden, Ontario. The Canadian Medical Association (CMA) recognized physician assistants as a health professional in 2003. Physician assistants are able to perform medical functions such as ordering tests, diagnosing diseases, prescribing medications, treating patients, educating patients and performing various medical and surgical procedures. Physician assistants are labeled under the federal government national occupational classification code 3124: allied primary health practitioners.

Education and certification

The first civilian physician assistant education programs were launched in 2008 at the University of Manitoba and McMaster University. In 2010, a third civilian program was launched by the consortium of physician assistant education (University of Toronto, Northern Ontario School of Medicine, and The Michener Institute). Admission to the physician assistant program in all three of the university programs across Canada are highly competitive with grades, education, interviews, professional experience, credentials, personal statements and testing considered in the candidate selection process. Approximately 15 seats at the University of Manitoba are available yearly while the two other programs in Ontario respectively have approximately 30 seats at the University of Toronto and approximately 24 seats at McMaster University. In Canada, the education of a physician assistant generally consists of three years of professional post-graduate university education. The education is delivered over a two calendar year time-frame by completing fall, winter and summer semesters for both years of the program in either a master level university physician assistant program or post-graduate professional university bachelor level physician assistant program. Physician assistant graduates become eligible for the certification exam by being a graduate of a Canadian physician assistant program that is recognized by the Physician Assistant Certification Council of Canada (Canadian Armed Forces physician assistant program, University of Manitoba, McMaster University and the consortium of physician assistant education all of which are accredited by the Canadian Medical Association).

Scope of practice
Physician assistants resemble and provide many of the functions of physicians in Canada and act as advanced-level medical provider. Physician assistants may be compared to the role of nurse practitioner by the general public and may be confused as the same profession. Nurse practitioners in Canada practice under an advanced nursing model. Physician assistants practice under a medical model, similarly modeled after medical school (physician) education. Nurse practitioners practice within their defined specific scope of practice autonomously and sometimes collaboratively. The defined scopes of a nurse practitioner include the areas of (family care, adults and paediatrics). Physician assistants are permitted to practice in all medical specialties by mirroring the practice of a physician with a full range of skills and scope by practicing both autonomously as a clinician and collaboratively with physicians when required. Some examples of practice areas for physician assistants include (emergency medicine, critical care medicine, cardiology, psychiatry, community and family medicine, neurology, surgery, orthopaedics, internal medicine, oncology, gastroenterology, military medicine, respirology, dermatology, women's health and many more specialities). Physician assistants may perform certain roles which have been traditionally only provided by physicians in clinical practice, making the PA's medical training over other providers unique in this regard.

Compensation
Physician assistant salaries in civilian practice in Canada are relatively new and can range from approximately $80,000 CAD for entry level positions to $142,000 CAD a year for experienced providers which are not on call and up to $178,000 CAD for experienced providers which are on call. The physician assistant profession is newer to civilian practice in Canada. The compensation report published in 2019 by the Canadian Association of Physician Assistants outlines the typical salaries across Canada being an entry median salary of approximately $80,000 CAD and an experienced median salary of approximately $105,000 CAD.

Regulation
Physician assistants are currently practicing across Canada in the Canadian Armed Forces as commissioned officers in domestic and international environments and have been in practice since the 1960s. Physician assistants outside of the Canadian Armed Forces practice usually in the public health care system in the provinces of Manitoba, Ontario, New Brunswick, Nova Scotia, and Alberta. Physician assistants have been regulated in Manitoba since 1999 and in New Brunswick since 2009 and are registrants of their respective provincial college of physicians and surgeons. In Ontario, Alberta and Nova Scotia the profession is not regulated at this time. Physician assistants in Ontario were introduced in 2007 to the public health system as a joint venture between the Ontario Ministry of Health and the Ontario Medical Association. In Alberta, a registry has been established for physician assistants under the College of Physicians and Surgeons of Alberta with future regulation underway. In Ontario, future regulation has been discussed by the Ontario Ministry of Health in which physician assistants would be members of the College of Physicians and Surgeons of Ontario. Physician assistants are represented by the Canadian Association of Physician Assistants, which originally was formed in October 1999 as the "Canadian Academy of Physician Assistants".

Germany 
In Germany the Physician Assistant is called :de:Arztassistent. It was introduced in 2007.

India 
The first PA program in India was established in 1992 with a focus on expanding cardiovascular surgery. Since then, eight additional programs have developed (in total seven baccalaureate and two master's level programs).

Ireland 
Physician Associates were introduced by the Health Service Executive in the mid-2010's. PAs may not write prescriptions.

Israel 
Physician Assistants were introduced in Israel in May 2016 to help augment a shrinking physician workforce. The initial training programs have been overseen by the ministry of health directly, but transition to academic training is planned. Israeli PA education is modeled after United States' and Netherlands' approaches, and has focused on former paramedics with bachelor's degrees. As of 2022, the 100 or so PAs in Israel work exclusively within Emergency Departments. While PA scope of practice includes many emergency procedures, Israeli PAs are not currently allowed to prescribe or administer medicine in non-emergency settings.

New Zealand 
In February 2015, Health Workforce New Zealand completed a Phase-2 trial of PAs who worked for a period of two years (2013–2015) in four clinical settings. Specifically, the sites included one rural emergency department and three primary care settings (two rural and one urban) located on the North and South Islands of New Zealand. At conclusion of the trial, several clinics continued to employ PAs while the process of health regulation makes its way through the government bureaucracy.

United Kingdom 
The position of physician associate was established in the United Kingdom in 2005. It evolved from that of physician assistant, developed in the US in the 1960s. In 2012, the profession voted to change the name to physician associate to distinguish it from another with the same name within the NHS. Hillingdon Hospitals NHS Foundation Trust was asked to manage the recruitment of 200 physician associates who are expected to come from the US for 40 NHS trusts in September 2015.

In 2022 it was reported that private company Operose Health, owned by US company Centene Corporation, which had acquired many UK National Health Service (NHS) GP practices, was using many PAs—at less than half the cost of a GP—and allowing them essentially to act as GPs, without required supervision. A BBC reporter worked undercover at an Operose practice for six weeks, reporting on many problems.  A senior GP said that the company was prioritising profit, putting patients at risk.

Faculty of Physician Associates, Royal College of Physicians
The Faculty of Physician Associates is the professional body for Physician Associates working in the United Kingdom. A joint venture between the Royal College of Physicians of London and the previous professional body, the United Kingdom Associate of Physician Associates, the Faculty officially launched in July 2015, taking over all professional responsibilities. The Faculty oversee the managed voluntary register, which all practising associates are encouraged to join, as well as setting and running the National Assessment Examination and National Recertification Examination.

Scope of practice
Physician Associates/Assistants are trained under the medical model, similarly to physicians, to deliver medical care in both primary and secondary care settings. Upon graduation, they can specialize in various areas, including acute medicine, primary care, emergency medicine, surgery, and psychiatry. Practitioners provide medical services similar to those provided by house officers or senior house officers. They are trained to perform tasks including diagnosis, taking medical histories, treatment, and complex medical procedures.

Voluntary register
The title physician associate is not a protected medical profession. Hence, even if a PA has trained in pharmacology and IRMER (ability to request radiology imaging – X-rays), they are not able to prescribe or request imaging. No regulatory body governs PAs. Since June 2010, physician associates have been able to obtain membership of the Managed Voluntary Register for physician associates. This database, run by PAs for PAs, aims to identify all qualified PAs who are able to practise. Its intent is to maintain high standards. To remain on the register, physician associates are required to re-certify every 5–6 years and maintain up-to-date practice through accumulating continuous professional development hours, which must be completed on an annual basis.

In 2018 Matt Hancock announced a plan regulate PAs, details of which have not been announced. The General Medical Council agreed to be the regulatory body for PAs, with regulation beginning in 2022.

Training
Training is through a two-year accelerated medical training (MSc or Postgraduate Diploma) in Physician Associate Studies.  at least 32 universities offered these programs:

 
 University of Bolton
 University of Hertfordshire
 Queen Mary University of London
 University of Aberdeen
 University of Bradford 
 Anglia Ruskin University 
 University of Birmingham
 Canterbury Christ Church University
 University of East Anglia
 Hull York Medical School 
 University of Leeds
 Manchester Medical School
 University of Liverpool
 University of Central Lancashire
 Newcastle University
 Plymouth University
 University of Reading
 Sheffield Hallam University 
 St George's, University of London
 University of Surrey
 University of Wolverhampton
 University of Worcester

Barts and the London School of Medicine and Dentistry, Queen Mary University of London requires candidates to hold a minimum of 2:2 or above in a Life Science, Biomedical Science, or Healthcare subject. Due to the competitive nature of this course, a ranking system defines the interview shortlist.

Aberdeen requires a science-based degree with a minimum 2:1 grade achieved while St George's requires a science-based degree with a minimum 2:2 grade. This includes sport science, biology, psychology and biomedical degrees. Applicants should preferably have healthcare experience. Applications from other professionals such as nurses, radiographers and paramedics will also be considered.

University of Bradford requires a 2:1 (or above) undergraduate degree in a Life Science, Biomedical Science, or Healthcare subject. Under exceptional circumstances, extensive experience in healthcare practice may contribute/compensate absent the above requirements.

Compensation

The average starting salary of a PA-R is Band 7 (£37,000), and can vary based on locations. In London, the average salary is around £43,000 and goes up to 50k with experience, particularly with lead PAs. PAs are also able to do locum shifts on top of their full-time job. Compensation of physician associates in the United Kingdom remains lower than in the United States and Canada. However, compensation of physician associates is on the same pay band as other advanced care providers such as nurse practitioners.

United States

Nomenclature
In accordance with the American Academy of Physician Associates (AAPA), the official title of the profession in the United States is "Physician Associate". While this is the official title nationally, utilization of this title may vary on the state level based on state bylaws and policies.

A physician assistant may use the initials "PA", "PA-C", "APA-C", "RPA" or "RPA-C", where the "-C" indicates "Certified" and the "R" indicates "Registered". The "R" designation is unique to a few states, mainly in the Northeast. APA stands for aeromedical physician assistant and indicates that a physician assistant successfully completed the US Army Flight Surgeon Primary Course. During training, PA students are designated PA-S. The use of "PA-C" is limited to certified PAs who comply with the regulations of the National Commission on Certification of Physician Assistants and who have passed PANCE.

Students undertaking physician assistant or associate training may refer to themselves as a physician assistant student, physician associate student in applicable countries, student physician assistant or student physician associate in applicable countries. PA students may add "S" at the end of their student designation (PA-S). Students may also use the corresponding year of their training in their student designation. For example, students in the second year of their physician assistant or physician associate training may use (PA-S2) as their student designation.

The American Academy of Physician Associates has spent over $22 million since 2018 campaigning to change the word "assistant" to "associate" in the title of physician assistant. The campaign has been heavily criticized by physicians. There are opposing views which see this change more accurately reflects the clinician’s role on the patient care team Physician assistants want to be called physician associates, but doctors cry foul.

In the United States, the profession is represented by the American Academy of Physician Associates. All PAs must graduate from a nationally accredited ARC-PA program as well as passing the national certification exam. In 1970 the American Medical Association passed a resolution to develop educational guidelines and certification procedures for PAs. The Duke University Medical Center Archives had established the Physician Assistant History Center, dedicated to the study, preservation, and presentation of the history of the profession. The PA History Center became its own institution in 2011, was renamed the PA History Society, and relocated to Johns Creek, Georgia.

Education and certification
, 243 accredited PA programs operated in the United States, with dozens more in development. Most educational programs are graduate programs leading to the award of master's degrees in either Physician Assistant Studies, Health Science (Master of Health Science), or Medical Science (MMSc), and require a bachelor's degree and Graduate Record Examination or Medical College Admission Test scores for entry. The majority of PA programs in the United States employ the CASPA application for selecting students. Professional licensure is regulated by state medical boards. PA students train at medical schools and academic medical centers across the country.

PA education is based on medical education; it typically requires 2 to 3 years of full-time graduate study like most master's degrees. (Medical school lasts four years plus a specialty-specific residency.) Training consists of classroom and laboratory instruction in medical and behavioral sciences, followed by clinical rotations in internal medicine, family medicine, surgery, pediatrics, obstetrics and gynecology, emergency medicine, and geriatric medicine, as well as elective rotations. PAs are not required to complete residencies after they complete their schooling (unlike physicians). Postgraduate training programs are offered in certain specialties for PAs, though these are optional and shorter in length than medical residency.

PA clinical postgraduate programs are clinical training programs that differ from on the job training given their inclusion of education and supervised clinical experience to meet learning objectives. Montefiore Medical Center Postgraduate Surgical Physician Assistant Program was established in 1971 as the first recognized clinical postgraduate PA program. 49 programs address specialties such as Neurology, Trauma/Critical Care and Oncology. 50 programs joined the Association of Postgraduate Physician Assistant Programs to establish educational standards for postgraduate PA programs.

In the United States, a graduate from an accredited PA program must pass the NCCPA-administered Physician Assistant National Certifying Exam (PANCE) before becoming a PA-C; this certification is required for licensure in all states. The content of the exam is covered in the PANCE BLUEPRINT. In addition, a PA must log 100 Continuing Medical Education hours and reregister his or her certificate with the NCCPA every two years. Every ten years (formerly six years), a PA must also recertify by successfully completing the Physician Assistant National Recertifying Exam (PANRE)
There is a growing number of doctoral programs for certified PAs leading to a Doctor of Medical Science (DMSc) but there is no requirement for one to have a doctorate in order to practice. 
"National Physician Assistant Week" is celebrated annually in the US from October 6 through October 12. This week was chosen to commemorate the anniversary of the first graduating physician assistant class at Duke University on October 6, 1967. October 6 is also the birthday of the profession's founder, Eugene A. Stead, Jr., MD.

Scope of practice
Physician assistants have their own licenses with distinct scope of practice. Each of the 50 states has different laws regarding the prescription of medications by PAs and the licensing authority granted to each category within that particular state through the Drug Enforcement Administration (DEA). PAs in Kentucky and Puerto Rico are not allowed to prescribe any controlled substances.
Several other states place a limit on the type of controlled substance or the quantity that can be prescribed, dispensed, or administered by a PA.
Depending upon the specific laws of any given state board of medicine, the PA must have a formal relationship on file with a collaborative physician. The collaborating physician must also be licensed in the state in which the PA is working, although he or she may physically be located elsewhere. Physician collaboration can be in person, by telecommunication systems or by other reliable means (for example, availability for consultation). In emergency departments the laws governing PA practice differ by state, generally allowing a broad scope of practice and limited direct supervision.

During the COVID-19 pandemic, several state  governments changed regulations regarding PA scope of practice, including: 
 On May 21, 2020, the law S.B. 1915 was signed by Oklahoma Governor Kevin Stitt. This law allows Physician Assistants to become primary care providers and receive direct pay from insurers. The reference of “supervision” was changed to “delegating” in regards to physician responsibility. This law also allows PAs to legally volunteer in the case of disaster or emergency.
 On May 27, 2020, Governor Tim Walz signed into Minnesota law the Omnibus Healthcare Bill S.F. 13. This law removes references to physician responsibility of supervision and delegation of care provided by PAs. The law also removes delegated prescriptive authority.

Employment

The first employer of PAs was the then-Veterans Administration, known today as the Department of Veterans Affairs. Today it is the largest single employer of PAs, employing nearly 2,000.

According to the AAPA, as of 2020 there are more than 148,560 certified PAs in the United States, up from 115,547 in 2016.

Money magazine, in conjunction with Salary.com, listed the PA profession as the "fifth best job in America" in May 2006, based both on salary and job prospects, and on an anticipated 10-year job growth of 49.65%. In 2010, CNN Money rated the physician assistant career as the number two best job in America.
In 2012, Forbes rated the physician assistant degree as the number one master's degree for jobs.
In 2015, Glassdoor rated physician assistant as the number one best job in America.
In 2021, US News & World Report rated physician assistant as the number one best job in America.

The US Department of Labor Bureau of Labor Statistics report on PAs states, "...Employment of physician assistants is projected to grow 37 percent from 2016 to 2026, much faster than the average for all occupations..." This is due to several factors, including an expanding health care industry, an aging baby-boomer population, concerns for cost containment, and newly implemented restrictions to shorten physician resident work hours. 

In the 2008 AAPA census, 56 percent of responding PAs worked in physicians' offices or clinics and 24 percent were employed by hospitals. The remainder were employed in public health clinics, nursing homes, schools, prisons, home health care agencies, and the United States Department of Veterans Affairs Fifteen percent of responding PAs work in counties classified as non-metropolitan by Economic Research Service of the United States Department of Agriculture; approximately 17% of the US population resides in these counties.

For PAs in primary care practice, malpractice insurance policies with $100,000–300,000 in coverage can cost less than $600 per year; premiums are higher for PAs in higher-risk specialties.

Compensation

According to Bureau of Labor Statistics, in 2020 the median pay for physician assistants working full-time was $115,390 per year or $55.48 per hour, and the highest 10 percent earned more than $162,470. Physician assistants in emergency medicine, dermatology, and surgical subspecialties may earn up to $200,000 per year.

Federal government, uniformed services, and US armed forces
PAs are employed by the United States Department of State as foreign service health practitioners. PAs working in this capacity may be deployed anywhere in the world where there is a State Department facility. They provide primary care to US government employees and their families in American embassies and consulates around the world. An important part of their jobs is to get to know what resources are available locally that they can count on in an emergency. They have other important roles, such as advising their ambassadors on the health situation in the country and provide health education to the diplomatic community. In order to be considered for the position, these PAs must be licensed and have at least two years of recent experience in primary care.

Military PAs serve in the White House Medical Unit, where they provide care to the president and vice president and their families as well as White House staff.

They are employed by several organizations with the intelligence community, specifically the Central Intelligence Agency. While much of the job description is classified, they work under the Directorate of Support and are deployed to "austere environments" where they provide medical care, including trauma stabilization, and teach in the fields of survival, field medicine, and tactical combat casualty care.

United States Army PAs serve as Medical Specialist Corps officers, typically within Army combat or combat support battalions located in the continental United States, Alaska, Hawaii, and overseas. These include infantry, armor, cavalry, airborne, artillery, and (if the PA qualifies) special forces units. They serve as the "front line" of Army medicine and along with combat medics are responsible for the total health care of soldiers assigned to their unit, as well as of their family members.

PAs also serve in the Air Force and Navy as clinical practitioners and aviation medicine specialists, as well as in the Coast Guard and Public Health Service. The skills required for these PAs are similar to that of their civilian colleagues, but additional training is provided in advanced casualty care, medical management of chemical injuries, aviation medicine, and military medicine. In addition, military PAs are also required to meet the officer commissioning requirements, and maintain the professional and physical readiness standards of their respective services.

The marine physician assistant is a US Merchant Marine staff officer. A certificate of registry is granted through The United States Coast Guard National Maritime Center located in Martinsburg, West Virginia. Formal training programs for marine physician assistants began in September, 1966 at the Public Service Health Hospital located in Staten Island, N.Y.

References

External links

American Academy of Physician Associates (AAPA)
Physician Assistant Education Association
National Commission on Certification of Physician Assistants (NCCPA)
Accreditation Review Commission on Education for the Physician Assistant (ARC-PA)
Canadian Association of Physician Assistants CAPA
UK Association of Physician Associates (UKAPA)
Israeli Association of Physician Assistants
Physician Assistant Forum

Health care occupations